Lists of dukedoms include:

 List of dukedoms in the peerages of Britain and Ireland
 Royal dukedoms in the United Kingdom
 List of French dukedoms
 Dukedoms in Portugal
 List of dukedoms in Spain
 Duchies in Sweden

See also
 Lists of dukes